The 2021 season was the Cincinnati Bengals' 52nd season in the National Football League (NFL), their 54th overall and their third under head coach Zac Taylor. They also played in new uniforms for the first time since 2004. The Bengals finished with a 10–7 record, exceeding their win total from the previous two seasons combined. The Bengals clinched their first winning season, first playoff appearance, and first AFC North title since 2015. It also marked their first Super Bowl appearance since 1988.

The Bengals began their playoff run by defeating the Las Vegas Raiders in the Wild Card round, winning their first playoff game since 1990, and ending what was the NFL's longest playoff win drought. They beat the top-seeded Tennessee Titans in the divisional round, which not only marked their first-ever playoff win on the road but also allowed them to advance to the AFC Championship Game for the first time since 1988. They upset the second-seeded Kansas City Chiefs in overtime. As a result, they advanced to Super Bowl LVI, their third Super Bowl in franchise history and first in 33 years. Quarterback Joe Burrow became the first second-year quarterback since Russell Wilson in 2013 to reach a Super Bowl, and the first No. 1-picked QB to do so within their first two seasons. However, the Bengals lost to the Los Angeles Rams in the Super Bowl 23–20.

Offseason

Free agents

Unrestricted

Restricted

Exclusive-Rights

Signings

Releases

Trades
 March 19 - Quarterback Ryan Finley and the Bengals' 2021 seventh-round selection (No. 231 overall) were traded to the Houston Texans for the Texans' 2021 sixth-round selection (No. 200 overall).
 August 30 - Center Billy Price was traded to the New York Giants for defensive tackle B.J. Hill.

Draft

Trades
 Seattle traded center B. J. Finney and Detroit's seventh-round selection (No. 235) to Cincinnati for defensive end Carlos Dunlap. 
 Cincinnati traded Ryan Finley and seventh round selection (No. 248) to the Houston Texans in exchange for a sixth-round selection (No. 202).
 Cincinnati traded their second-round selection (38th overall) to the New England Patriots in exchange for the Patriots second-round selection (46th overall) and two fourth-round selections (122nd and 139th overall).

Undrafted free agents
The Bengals announced their Undrafted free agent class on May 14.

Staff

Final roster

<noinclude>

NFL Top 100

Preseason
The Bengals' preseason opponents and schedule were announced on May 12.

Regular season

Schedule
The Bengals 2021 schedule was announced on May 12. 

Note: Intra-division opponents are in bold text.

Game summaries

Week 1: vs. Minnesota Vikings

Week 2: at Chicago Bears

Week 3: at Pittsburgh Steelers
This was Cincinnati's first win in Pittsburgh since 2015.

Week 4: vs. Jacksonville Jaguars
The Bengals improved to 3–1 for the first time since 2018 with this win, despite only taking the lead with 4 seconds left in the game on a game winning Evan McPherson field goal. Burrow was recognized as the AFC Offensive Player of the Week for his performance in this game, in which he completed 25 out of 32 passes for a total of 348 yards and two touchdowns with no interceptions, posting a 132.8 passer rating.

Week 5: vs. Green Bay Packers

Week 6: at Detroit Lions

Week 7: at Baltimore Ravens

Week 8: at New York Jets

Week 9: vs. Cleveland Browns

Week 11: at Las Vegas Raiders

Week 12: vs. Pittsburgh Steelers

Week 13: vs. Los Angeles Chargers

Week 14: vs. San Francisco 49ers

Week 15: at Denver Broncos

Week 16: vs. Baltimore Ravens

With the win this marks the first time since 2009 that the Bengals swept division rivals Pittsburgh and Baltimore in the same season.

Week 17: vs. Kansas City Chiefs

Week 18: at Cleveland Browns

Standings

Division

Conference

Postseason

Schedule

Game summaries

AFC Wild Card Playoffs: vs. (5) Las Vegas Raiders

AFC Divisional Playoffs: at (1) Tennessee Titans

AFC Championship: at (2) Kansas City Chiefs

Super Bowl LVI: vs. (N4) Los Angeles Rams

Notes

Statistics

Team

Individual

Statistics correct as of the end of the 2021 NFL season

References

External links
 

Cincinnati
Cincinnati Bengals seasons
AFC North championship seasons
American Football Conference championship seasons
Cincinnati Bengals